Alberto Arakaki (born May 14, 1972) is a Brazilian professional vert skater. Arakaki started skating when he was 6 in 1978, met aggressive inline skating at age 20 (1995) and turned professional in 1996. Arakaki has won many competitions in his vert skating career.

Best Tricks: McTwists and flatspins

Local vert competitions 
1995 Campeonato Rollerbrothers – Barra Funda/SP – Vert: 4th (amateur)
1996 Campeonato Roller Action – Mooca/SP – Vert: 1st
1996 Etapa ASA Brasil Rock & Roller – Santana/SP – Vert: 1st
1996 Campeonato Rollerbrothers – Barra Funda/SP – Vert: 1st
1996 Etapa ASA Brasil Rock & Roller – Santana/SP – Vert: 2nd
1996 Feiteens – Center Norte/SP – Vert: 3rd
1997 Feiteens – Center Norte/SP – Vert: 5th
1997 Etapa ASA Brasil – Pinheiros/SP – Vert: 2nd
1997 FERA Brasil – Shopping Eldorado/SP – Vert: 5th
1997 Desafio Aereo – Shopping Eldorado/SP – Vert: 2nd
1998 Desafio Aereo – Praia de Baraqueçaba/SP – Vert: 1st
1998 Etapa ASA Brasil – Praia de Baraqueçada/SP  – Vert: 1st
1999 Etapa ASA Brasil – Praia de Sao Vicente/SP – Vert: 1st
1999 Campeonato de Duplas – Praia de Sao Vicente/SP – Vert: 2nd
2002 Z-Games – Ginasio do Ibirapuera/SP – Vert: 6th
2004 Circuito Nescau Energy – Ginasio Militar/POA/RS – Vert: 7th
2005 Rio Vert Jam – Lagoa Rodrigo de Freitas/RJ Vert: 4th
2006 Rio Vert Jam – Lagoa Rodrigo de Freitas/RJ Vert: 5th
2017 Indaiamonster – Sao Bernardo do Campo/SP – Vert: 3rd
2018 Indaiamonster – Sao Bernardo do Campo/SP - Vert: 4th
2019 Indaiamonsters - Fabrika do Skate/Itu - Vert: 4th

International vert competitions 

1998 X-Treme Peru – Mira Flores/PERU – Vert: 1st
1998 X-Treme Peru categoria BMX Freestyle Mira Flores/PERU – Flatland: 1st
1998 IISS (International Inline Skate Series) – Praia de Baraqueçaba/SP/BRAZIL – Vert: 5th
1999 IISS (International Inline Skate Series) – Sao Vicente/SP/BRAZIL – Vert: 7th
1999 X-Games – Virginia Beach/EUA – Vert: 13th
1999 Ultimate Inline Skate by Rollerblade – Universal Studios/EUA – Vert: 19th
2000 ASA Japan (JASPA) GR Holliday Sk8 Park – Taketoyo/JAPAN – Vert: 2nd
2001 ASA Japan (JASPA) GR Holliday Sk8 Park – Taketoyo/JAPAN – Vert: 1st
2001 Tokyo Aggressive Inline Circuit (Vert) – Toyama/JAPAN – Vert: 3rd
2001 Tokyo Aggressive Inline Circuit (Street) – Toyama/JAPAN – Vert: 6th
2001 ASA Finals (JASPA) – Osaka/JAPAN – Vert: 3rd
2002 Latin X-Games I Barracao do Flamengo/RJ/BRAZIL – Vert: 9th
2003 Latin X-Games II Praia do Leme/RJ/BRAZIL – Vert: 13th
2004 Latin X-Games III Praia do Leme/RJ/BRAZIL – Vert: 10th
2006 Globo Pro Rad Ginásio do Ibirapuera/SP – Vert: 5th

Shows Demos 
Squizz/Yopa – Guaruja/SP (96)
Feiteens – Sampa/SP (96)
Fenatec – Lar Center/SP(96)
Abertura da pista de street na Rollerbrothers – Barra Funda/SP (97)
Playcenter Crazy Days – Sampa/SP (97)
Feiteens – Sampa/SP (97)
Team RB com Chris Edwards – Praia do Leme/RJ (97)
Team RB com Chris Edwards – Bowl Rio Santos (97)
Team RB com Chris Edwards na Rock & Roller Santana/SP (97)
Team RB com Chris Edwards na Rollerbrothers Barra Funda/SP (97)
Demo Rollerbrothers III - Porto Alegre/RS
Demo Roller Bah Tche - Porto Alegre/RS
Team Roces Tour – Rollerbrothers/SP (98)
Team Roces Tour – Rock'n'Roller/SP (98)
Tong Do Sa Park Tour – Tong Do/Coreia do Sul (98)
Playcenter Crazy Days – Sampa/SP (98)
Daytona Sk8 Park Peru – Mira Flores/Peru (98)
Planeta Atlantida – Praia Atlantida/RS (99)
Fenac Center Norte – Santana/SP (99)
Oficina & Companhia – Salto/SP (99)
Juiz no Z-Games (2002)
Juiz na 2a etapa Nescau Radical em MG (2003)
Tent Beach Best Trick Insano Shoppping Dom Pedro Campinas/SP (23/03/2003)
Facira 2003
Domingo Radical – Atibaia/SP (2003)
Dia D em Sampa Anhangabaú (2003)
Team Red Bull em Araxa/MG (2005)
Team Red Bull no Salão 4 rodas em SP (2005)
GAS Festival 2007
GAS Festival 2008 
1º encontro ESTILOGRAUº sessão na mini ramp Indaiatuba (2012) Indaiatuba/SP
Indaiamonsters Blade Indaiatuba/SP (25/08/2012)
CBER Indaiatuba/SP 2012
Game of Blade by Achrezzi - Indaiatuba/SP (02/12/2012)
Indaiamonsters - Indaiatuba/SP (07/09/2015)
Indaiamonsters - SBC/SP 2017
Indaiamonsters - SBC/SP 2018
Indaiamonsters - Itu/SP 2019
Indaiamonsters - Indaiatuba/SP 10/12/2022

References

External links
360graus.terra.com.br
rioinline.com.br
360graus.terra.com.br
flogao.com.br
treestyleclothing.com
tribunaindaia.com.br
estilograu.com
globoesporte.globo.com
rioinline.com.br
rioinline.com.br
lost.art.br
espneventmedia.com
rioinline.com.br
tribunaindaia.com.br
tribunaindaia.com.br
https://archive.today/20130219175716/http://colmaxplanck.blogspot.com.br/2012/10/entrevista-com-alberto-arakaki-japasao.html

Vert skaters
1972 births
Living people
X Games athletes